John Home (1722–1808) was a Scottish writer.

John Home may also refer to:

John Home, Lord Renton (died 1671), Lord Justice Clerk
John Home Home (–1860), officer of the British Army
Multiple people of the Home baronets
Sir John Home, 2nd Baronet (died 1695)
Sir John Home, 1st Baronet (died 1675)
Sir John Home, 2nd Baronet (died 1706)
Sir John Home, 3rd Baronet
Sir John Home, 5th Baronet (died 1737)
Sir John Home, 9th Baronet (1829–1849)
Sir John Home, 12th Baronet (1872–1938)

See also
John Hume (disambiguation)